Limnoporus canaliculatus is a species of water strider in the family Gerridae. It is found in North America.

References

Gerrini
Articles created by Qbugbot
Insects described in 1832